Joel Crawford may refer to: 

Joel Crawford (film director), American story artist and film director
Joel Crawford (politician) (1783–1858), American politician, soldier and lawyer

See also
Joseph Crawford (disambiguation)